Thomas Reineck (born 18 November 1967) is a West German-German sprint canoeist who competed from the late 1980s to the mid-1990s. Competing in three Summer Olympics, he won two gold medals in the K-4 1000 m event, earning them in 1992 and 1996.

Reineck also won thirteen medals at the ICF Canoe Sprint World Championships with five golds (K-4 500 m: 1991, K-4 1000 m: 1993, 1995; K-4 10000 m: 1991, 1993), three silvers (K-4 500 m: 1993, 1995; K-4 1000 m: 1991), and five bronzes (K-4 200 m: 1995, K-4 500 m: 1986, 1987; K-4 1000 m: 1994, K-4 10000 m: 1987).

References
 DatabaseOlympics.com profile

External links
 
 

1967 births
Canoeists at the 1988 Summer Olympics
Canoeists at the 1992 Summer Olympics
Canoeists at the 1996 Summer Olympics
German male canoeists
Living people
Olympic canoeists of Germany
Olympic canoeists of West Germany
Olympic gold medalists for Germany
Olympic medalists in canoeing
ICF Canoe Sprint World Championships medalists in kayak
Medalists at the 1996 Summer Olympics
Medalists at the 1992 Summer Olympics